As of 2012, there is no rail transport in Nicaragua.  All traffic has been suspended since September 2001, ending several decades of a steady decline.  In the past, there were  gauge railroads on the Pacific coast, connecting major cities.  A private  line also formerly operated on the Atlantic coast.

History

In fiction
Ferrocarril del Pacífico de Nicaragua uses F6 steam locomotive and EP-2 electric locomotive in openBVE.

See also
 History of rail transport in Nicaragua
 Rail transport by country
 Rail transport
 Nicaragua
 Transportation in Nicaragua

References

External links